The World Futsal Association (AMF) is the governing body of futsal (football of salon [futsalon], in Spanish fútbol de salón [microfutbol]) for both fully and non-independent states or regions, headquartered in Asuncion, Paraguay. It was founded on 25 July 1971 as the International Futsal Federation (FIFUSA) in Rio de Janeiro, Brazil; on 1 December 2002, the organization was replaced, changed its name to Spanish version Asociación Mundial de Futsal.

Names
 FIFUSA (1971–2002)
 AMF (2003–present)

History
See also Futsal History
Futsal started in Montevideo, Uruguay in 1930 when Juan Carlos Ceriani created a version of indoor football for recreation in YMCAs. In 1965, the South American Futsal Confederation was formed, consisting of Uruguay, Paraguay, Peru, Argentina and Brazil.

The sport began to spread across South America, and its popularity ensured that a governing body was formed under the name of FIFUSA (Federación Internacional de Fútbol de Salón) in 1971, comprising Argentina, Bolivia, Brazil, Paraguay, Peru, Portugal and Uruguay, along with the World Championships. The first FIFUSA World Championships were held in São Paulo, with hosts Brazil crowned champions ahead of Paraguay and Uruguay. Even more countries participated in the second World Championships held in Madrid in 1985.

Due to a dispute between FIFA and FIFUSA over the name of fútbol, FIFUSA registered the word futsal in 1985 (Madrid, Spain). In the 1990s, FIFA wanted to promote and spread its own version of indoor football, different from the original one played in the South American countries, but didn't manage to find an agreement with FIFUSA at the Rio de Janeiro Congress in 1989. In 2000, there was an attempt to repair the situation in Guatemala, while FIFA was celebrating in this country holding its fourth World Championship of Fútsal.

In 2002, FIFUSA was reorganised into World Futsal Association — AMF.

Organization

AMF competitions
The AMF and its respective confederations organize futsal tournaments around the world. The AMF Futsal World Cup, which was first staged in 1982, is held every four years.

A women's world cup was first staged in 2008. In 2017 the Brazil women's team became the first non-host nation to win the world championship.

Current title holders

See also
European Union of Futsal (UEFS)
UEFS Futsal Men's Championship
UEFS Futsal Women's Championship
Futsal (fútbol de salón, microfutbol, football sala, futsalon, calcio a 5 indoor).
Futsal Association of India

References

External links
 Asociación Mundial de Futsal (AMF)

Futsal organizations